Thursday's Child may refer to:

Literature
 Thursday's Child (Streatfeild novel)
 Thursday's Child (Hartnett novel)
 Thursday's Child (Forrester novel), by Helen Forrester
 Thursday's Child, autobiography by Eartha Kitt
 Thursday's Child, a group of writers that met in El Cerrito, California, which included Marion Zimmer Bradley, Ursula le Guin, Chelsea Quinn Yarbro, and Anne Rice
 Thursday's Children, by Rumer Godden

Music
 "Thursday's Child" (David Bowie song)
 "Thursday's Child" (Tanita Tikaram song)
 Minisode 2: Thursday's Child (Tomorrow x Together EP)

Television and film
 Thursday's Child (1943 film)
 Thursday's Child (1983 film)
 Thursday's Child (television series), 1972-1973 British television series

Other
 Thursday's Child (racing yacht), which took part at the BOC Challenge

See also
 Monday's Child nursery rhyme